Pentremites is an extinct genus of blastoid echinoderm belonging to the family Pentremitidae.

Description
These stalked echinoderms averaged a height of about  but occasionally ranged up to about 3 times that size. They, like other blastoids, superficially resemble their distant relatives, the crinoids or sea lilies, having a near-identical, planktivorous lifestyle living on the sea floor attached by a stalk.  As with all other blastoids, species of Pentremites trapped food floating in the currents by means of tentacle-like appendages.

Pentremites species  lived in the early to middle Carboniferous, from 360.7 to 314.6 Ma. Its fossils are known from North America.

References

 Fossils (Smithsonian Handbooks) by David Ward (Page 190)

Blastozoa genera
Carboniferous echinoderms of North America
Fossils of Georgia (U.S. state)
Paleozoic life of Alberta
Paleozoic life of the Northwest Territories
Paleozoic life of Yukon